American singer Lenny Kravitz has released 11 studio albums, one greatest hits compilation album, four box set compilation albums, two extended plays, 58 singles, and eight video albums, including three live albums. His debut album Let Love Rule (1989) peaked at number 61 in the US, and while receiving generally positive reviews, it became a huge success in Europe but took a long time to reach success in the US. Its followers, Mama Said (1991) and Are You Gonna Go My Way (1993) sold better overall than his debut, achieving platinum and multi-platinum status respectively, establishing Kravitz in the music industry and expanding his success in Europe and South America. However, despite only a two-year gap between albums, personal issues such as substance abuse problems, the aftermath of divorce, and his mother Roxie Roker's illness led to a decline in commercial sales with Circus (1995).

With 5 (1998), Kravitz embraced a fresh outlook towards his career and also experimented with electronic equipment such as Pro Tools. Initially, the album received only mediocre reviews, and it took a slow and steady process for it to achieve worldwide success after spinning off hits such as "I Belong to You" and "Fly Away" to ultimately become Kravitz's most successful studio album to date. It would be the album to establish his career at a higher level, with increasing worldwide popularity, especially in Europe, and would win him his first two Grammy Awards. Greatest Hits (2000) would become Kravitz's most successful album to date, going on to sell over 10.5 million copies worldwide, earning him yet another Grammy Award. While Lenny (2001) would prove to be a very fast seller, although not quite comparing to 5 or Greatest Hits, it managed to win Kravitz his fourth consecutive Grammy Award. However, Baptism was somewhat of a commercial disappointment for the multi-platinum selling artist when compared to its predecessors. Most recently, his 2008 release It Is Time for a Love Revolution had Kravitz realising some of the best debut positions and opening sales weeks worldwide in years, along with his best critical reviews since Lenny.

According to recent sales numbers, a number of his albums (Let Love Rule, Mama Said, 5 and Greatest Hits) have been confirmed to have achieved a sales status high enough to be certified at the next level within the sales threshold, but RIAA still has them certified at the sales level they are currently at, with no official word on whether/when the certifications may occur. In addition to writing and producing all of his own work, Kravitz has produced albums for other artists, some reaching great success. He personally has scored three top 10 albums in the US, while having reached number one in both the UK and Australia. Kravitz has scored hits in virtually every continent: North America (US and Canada), Central America (Bahamas), Europe (United Kingdom, France, Germany, Spain and Scandinavia), South America (Brazil, Argentina and Colombia), Asia (Japan), Oceania (Australia and New Zealand), and Africa (Republic of South Africa). Considered one of the most successful and best-selling rock artists of his time, Kravitz has had sales of approximately 40 million albums alone worldwide (not including singles and video releases).

Albums

Studio albums

Notes

Compilations

Box sets

EPs
1994: Spinning Around Over You
1995: Is There Any Love in Your Heart

Singles

As lead artist

As featured artist

Music videos

Other appearances
Other notable works in Kravitz's repertoire are numerous charity albums and collaborations with artists of a wide range of genres. In 1990, he co-wrote and co-produced Madonna's "Justify My Love" single where he also appeared as background vocalist. Kravitz sang a duet titled "Main Squeeze" with Teena Marie on her album Passion Play (Sarai Label, 1994). Upon her death, he posted a heartfelt tribute to her saying that she had contributed so much to who he is. In 1993 he appeared in Duff McKagan's debut album Believe in Me singing lead vocals in the song "The Majority". He has participated in numerous soundtracks such as Reality Bites (1994), Austin Powers: The Spy Who Shagged Me (1999), and Bad Boys II (2003). He contributed tracks to Power of Soul: A Tribute to Jimi Hendrix and Goin' Home: A Tribute to Fats Domino. The 2004 album The Unplugged Collection, Volume One features a live version of "Are You Gonna Go My Way". In 2008, he wrote "Change" for the Change Is Now: Renewing America's Promise compilation album. Two of Kravitz's songs are featured separately on two different albums of the Big Shiny Tunes compilation series ("Fly Away" on Big Shiny Tunes 3 and "American Woman" on Big Shiny Tunes 4). He also appeared on Michael Jackson's posthumous track "(I Can't Make It) Another Day". Kravitz co-wrote most of the self-titled 1992 album by Vanessa Paradis, which produced the worldwide hit Be My Baby (Vanessa Paradis song).

References

Notes

Discographies of American artists
Discography
Rock music discographies